The group stage of the 2013 AFC Champions League was played from 26 February to 1 May 2013. A total of 32 teams competed in the group stage.

Draw
The draw for the group stage was held on 6 December 2012, 16:00 UTC+8, at the AFC House in Kuala Lumpur, Malaysia. The 32 teams were drawn into eight groups of four. Teams from the same association could not be drawn into the same group.

The following 32 teams (16 from West Zone, 16 from East Zone) were entered into the group-stage draw, which included the 29 automatic qualifiers and the three qualifying play-off winners, whose identity was not known at the time of the draw:

West Zone (Groups A–D)
 Al-Shabab
 Al-Ahli
 Al-Hilal
 Al-Ettifaq
 Lekhwiya
 Al-Gharafa
 El Jaish
 Al-Rayyan
 Sepahan
 Esteghlal
 Tractor Sazi
 Al-Ain
 Al-Jazira
 Pakhtakor
Winner of play-off West 1:  Al-Shabab Al-Arabi
Winner of play-off West 2:  Al-Nasr

East Zone (Groups E–H)
 Sanfrecce Hiroshima
 Kashiwa Reysol
 Vegalta Sendai
 Urawa Red Diamonds
 FC Seoul
 Pohang Steelers
 Jeonbuk Hyundai Motors
 Suwon Samsung Bluewings
 Guangzhou Evergrande
 Jiangsu Sainty
 Beijing Guoan
 Guizhou Renhe
 Bunyodkor
 Central Coast Mariners
 Muangthong United
Winner of play-off East:  Buriram United

Format
In the group stage, each group was played on a home-and-away round-robin basis. The winners and runners-up of each group advanced to the round of 16.

Tiebreakers
The teams are ranked according to points (3 points for a win, 1 point for a tie, 0 points for a loss). If tied on points, tiebreakers are applied in the following order:
Greater number of points obtained in the group matches between the teams concerned
Goal difference resulting from the group matches between the teams concerned
Greater number of goals scored in the group matches between the teams concerned (away goals do not apply)
Goal difference in all the group matches
Greater number of goals scored in all the group matches
Penalty shoot-out if only two teams are involved and they are both on the field of play
Fewer score calculated according to the number of yellow and red cards received in the group matches (1 point for a single yellow card, 3 points for a red card as a consequence of two yellow cards, 3 points for a direct red card, 4 points for a yellow card followed by a direct red card)
Drawing of lots

Groups
The matchdays were 26–27 February, 12–13 March, 2–3 April, 9–10 April, 23–24 April, and 30 April–1 May 2013.

Group A

Group B

Tiebreakers
Al-Ettifaq are ranked ahead of Pakhtakor on head-to-head record.

Group C

Group D

Group E

Tiebreakers
Buriram United and Jiangsu Sainty are tied on head-to-head record, and so are ranked by overall goal difference.

Group F

Tiebreakers
Jeonbuk Hyundai Motors are ranked ahead of Urawa Red Diamonds on head-to-head record.

Group G

Group H

References

External links

2